George Craig may refer to:
George Henry Craig (1845–1923), U.S. Representative from Alabama
George Craig (baseball) (1887–1911), baseball player for 1907 Philadelphia Athletics
George N. Craig (1909–1992), governor of Indiana
George Craig (musician) (born 1990), English frontman of band One Night Only
George B. Craig (1930–1995), American biologist and entomologist
George Craig (architect) (1852–1927), Scottish architect and amateur geologist